Benjamin Mason (fl. 1656) was an English politician.

He was a Member (MP) of the Parliament of England for Herefordshire in 1656.

References

Year of birth missing
Year of death missing
English MPs 1656–1658